Steven Michael Burke (born March 5, 1955) is a former Major League Baseball pitcher who played for the Seattle Mariners from -.

References

External links

1955 births
Living people
Baseball players from California
Major League Baseball pitchers
Seattle Mariners players
Jacksonville Suns players
Winter Haven Red Sox players
Elmira Pioneers players
Spokane Indians players